Chikunia nigra is a species of spider of the genus Chikunia. It is found in Sri Lanka to Taiwan, and Indonesia.

See also
 List of Theridiidae species

References

Theridiidae
Endemic fauna of Sri Lanka
Spiders of Asia
Spiders described in 1880